Fallen Champ: The Untold Story of Mike Tyson is a 1993 American made-for-television documentary film that is directed by Barbara Kopple and aired on the NBC television network on February 12, 1993.
Though Tyson was in jail serving a sentence for rape, Kopple used existing interviews with the boxer, as well as her own extensive interviews with those closest to Tyson, to explore the man's history. The film traces Tyson's story from his troubled and tumultuous upbringing, through his rapid ascendancy in the ranks of the boxing world and his subsequent struggle with the trappings of fame. Fallen Champ earned Barbara Kopple a Directors Guild of America (DGA) award as Best Documentary Director of 1993.

The film was released on VHS by Columbia TriStar Home Video on March 5, 1996.

In 2011, the film was aired on ESPN Classic.

References

External links
 Director Barbara Kopple's Website
 
 

Documentary films about sportspeople
Documentary films about boxing
Films directed by Barbara Kopple
American sports documentary films
1993 films
Mike Tyson
1993 television films
1993 documentary films
NBC network original films
1990s English-language films
1990s American films